Gudli is a village in Mavli Tehsil in Udaipur district in the Indian state of Rajasthan. It is administrated by Mavli assembly constituency. It is located on a hilly area above 502 meters above the sea level and 42 km east from the Udaipur city.

References 

Villages in Udaipur district